Fatehpur  is a village located in district of Gujrat, Pakistan.

References

Villages in Gujrat District